The 2021 Super W season had a different format to previous seasons. With the inclusion of the President's XV, teams were split into two pools of three. This format however was only for the 2021 season. The competition will revert to the usual home and away format in 2022. After the first round of the season the Western Force withdrew from the competition due to the ongoing COVID-19 outbreak in New South Wales. NSW Waratahs won their fourth consecutive Super W title after defeating Queensland 45 - 12 in the final. A Super W Select team played the Presidents XV in the finals, they replaced the Western Force. The Super W Select were only given 48 hours to prepare.

Teams

Ladder

Pool A

Pool B 

1Following Western Force Women's withdrawal from the competition, their remaining two matches were recorded as 0-0 draws.

2Western Force Women were replaced by the Super W Select for the finals.

Regular season

Round 1

Round 2

Round 3

Finals

References 

2021
2021 in Australian rugby union
2021 in women's rugby union
2021 in Australian women's sport